Yuma Proving Ground (YPG) is a United States Army series of environmentally specific test centers with its Yuma Test Center being one of the largest military installations in the world. It is subordinate to the U.S. Army Test and Evaluation Command.

Overview

The proving ground conducts tests on nearly every weapon in the ground combat arsenal. Nearly all the long-range artillery testing for U.S. ground forces takes place here in an area almost completely removed from urban encroachment and noise concerns. Realistic villages and road networks representing urban areas in Southwest Asia have been constructed and are used for testing counter-measures to the threat of roadside bombs. It is estimated that the track can be used to test about 80 percent of the Army's wheeled vehicle fleet.

More than 3,000 people, mostly civilians, work at the proving ground, which is the largest employer in Yuma County.

In a typical year, over 500,000 artillery, mortar and missile rounds are fired, 36,000 parachute drops take place,  are driven on military vehicles, and over 4,000 air sorties are flown from the proving ground's Laguna Army Airfield.

About 10 percent of the proving ground's workload is training. In a typical year, dozens of units come to the facility for realistic desert training, especially before deploying overseas.

Urban encroachment and noise concerns are nonexistent problems, unlike at many other military installations.

Of the four extreme natural environments recognized as critical in the testing of military equipment, three fall under the management authority of Yuma Proving Ground. Realistic natural environment testing ensures that American military equipment performs as advertised, wherever deployed around the world. The proving ground manages military equipment and munitions testing at three locations: The Cold Regions Test Center at Fort Greely, Alaska; the Tropic Regions Test Center operating in Panama, Honduras, Suriname, and Hawaii; and at the Yuma Test Center located at Yuma Proving Ground. The common link between these test centers is "environmental testing," which makes the proving ground the Army's environmental test expert.

Yuma Proving Ground tests improvised explosive devices, commonly known as IEDs, the number-one killer of American service men and women in Iraq and Afghanistan. Hundreds of unmanned aerial vehicles fly at the proving ground each year from the six airfields located at the proving ground, as do helicopters and fixed-wing aircraft conducting personnel and cargo parachute drops.

Many friendly foreign nations also visit the proving ground to conduct test programs.

General Motors Desert Proving Ground 

The General Motors Desert Proving Ground – Yuma opened at the proving ground in late July 2009. General Motors built the facility at a cost of more than $100 million after closing its desert automotive test facility in Mesa, Arizona, that had been in operation since 1953. The new facility allows Army automotive testers to test their wheeled vehicles all year-round.

History
The presence of the U.S. Army in Yuma goes back to 1850, when Fort Yuma was constructed on a hill overlooking the important Yuma crossing of the Colorado River. Soldiers at Fort Yuma maintained peace and protected the important Yuma crossing, which was used by thousands of travelers each year.

The Army constructed a second facility in 1865, the Yuma Quartermaster Depot, to act as a supply base for Army posts throughout Arizona and parts of New Mexico. Supplies were delivered by riverboats and transported from the depot to military outposts by wagon. After Fort Yuma and the Yuma Quartermaster Depot closed in the 1880s, the Army did not return to Yuma on a permanent basis until World War II.

Yuma Proving Ground traces its history to Camp Laguna and the Army Corps of Engineers Yuma Test Branch, both activated in 1943. Located on the Colorado River, the Yuma Test Branch conducted testing on combat bridges, amphibious vehicles, and boats. Tens of thousands of mechanized and infantry soldiers were trained at Camp Laguna for duty at combat fronts throughout the world, from North Africa to the South Pacific. Abandoned campsites and tank trails can still be found on the proving ground.

Camp Laguna lasted only until the end of World War II. The Yuma Test Branch was closed in 1949 and reactivated two years later as the Yuma Test Station, under the operational control of the Sixth U.S. Army. In 1962, the station was named Yuma Proving Ground and reassigned to the U. S. Army Materiel Command as an important component of the Test and Evaluation Command. On July 26, 1973, it officially received its full name – U.S. Army Yuma Proving Ground. The following year it was designated as a Department of Defense Major Range and Test Facility Base.

Since its early days, Yuma Proving Ground has been a desert environmental test center for all types of military equipment and materiel. However, developmental and a variety of other types of testing of artillery systems and ammunition, aircraft armament and targeting systems, mobility equipment, and air delivery systems, not necessarily desert environmental-related, now comprise the bulk of the workload. A heavy investment in technology and a highly skilled soldier-civilian workforce makes the proving ground a significant social and economic component of the local community.

Demographics
The residential portion of the base was listed as a census-designated place (Yuma Proving Ground CDP) in the 2020 census.

Yuma Test Center

Yuma Test Center offers the following for test, evaluation, and training purposes:
 Ground weapons systems from small arms to long range artillery
 Helicopter armament and target acquisition systems
 Artillery and tank munitions
 Cargo and personnel parachutes, including guided systems technologies
 Land mines and mine-removal systems
 Tracked and wheeled vehicles in a desert environment
 Vibration and interference-free tests of smart weapon systems
 12 drop zones and multiple airstrips for Unmanned Aerial Systems
 A  overland artillery range, the longest in the nation
 Over  of improved road courses for tracked and wheeled vehicles
 State-of-the-art fiber optics systems to acquire, reduce and transmit data in real time
 Specialized facilities for testing countermeasures for the defeat of roadside bombs, such as the National Counterterrorism/Counterinsurgency Integrated Test and Evaluation site

Tropic Regions Test Centers

Cold Regions Test Center

References

External links
 

Buildings and structures in La Paz County, Arizona
Buildings and structures in Yuma County, Arizona
United States Army posts
Military installations in Arizona
Proving grounds
1943 establishments in Arizona
Historic American Engineering Record in Arizona